The Women's International Boxing Federation (WIBF) is one of the more recognized world championship fight sanctioning organizations in women's boxing. Founded in March 1989, it is based in Miami, Florida, and presided over by Barbara Buttrick. The WIBF is not associated with the similarly named International Boxing Federation (IBF), which promotes men's and women's boxing.

See also

Women's International Boxing Association

References

External links

Professional boxing organizations
International sports organizations
Sports organizations established in 1989
Women's boxing
International women's organizations
International organizations based in the United States
Women's sports governing bodies